Killer is the fourth studio album by Australian musician Dan Sultan, released in July 2017.

At the ARIA Music Awards of 2017, the album was nominated for three awards; ARIA Award for Best Male Artist, Best Rock Album and Best Independent Album.

Reception
ABC said "Killer is full of great songs. It gives more bang for buck than any Dan Sultan record so far, and the fact that it is an evolution in his sound is just a welcome bonus. Dan Sultan is still a rockstar on Killer, just one of a different kind. It suits him just fine."

Jake Cleland from Stack said "Killer delivers gospel and blues in a package of tight rock songs." adding "[the album] is poised to sweep up anyone not already on Sultan's soul train."

Josh Butler from Huffington Post said "[Sultan] set aside his trusty guitar for much of the record, instead moving toward synthesisers and electronic drums. The classic Sultan touches are still there, and this is still very much a blues record -- but it feels newer, more urgent and vital."

Paul Smith from Sydney Morning Herald said on Killer, "[Sultan] created an altogether more ambitious sound, with electronica, choirs and orchestral elements added to his gutsy, bluesy, gospel tone."

Track listing

Charts

Release history

References

2017 albums
Dan Sultan albums
Liberation Records albums